"The Rains of Castamere" is a song appearing in the A Song of Ice and Fire novels and in the television series adaptation Game of Thrones. The song's lyrics were written by George R. R. Martin in the original novel, and the tune was composed by Ramin Djawadi in 2011, upon request from the series creators David Benioff and D. B. Weiss. The song appears multiple times throughout the books and show.

Content 

The song recounts the ruthlessness of the character Tywin Lannister in destroying House Reyne ("the Reynes of Castamere") and House Tarbeck, rebellious vassals of House Lannister, some 40 years before the events of the novels. The stanza of the song that appears in the novels and is adapted for the television series tells of the vassals' defiance – "And who are you, the proud lord said / That I must bow so low?" – and the subsequent extermination of their houses: "But now the rains weep o'er his hall / With no one there to hear."

Uses 
The song's lyrics first appear in the novel A Storm of Swords, in which "The Rains of Castamere" is sung or mentioned several times. Late in the novel, the song is performed at the Red Wedding, another massacre of Tywin Lannister's enemies.

In the TV series, the tune is first heard when Tyrion Lannister whistles a small part in season 2 episode 1 ("The North Remembers"). In season 2 episode 9, Bronn sings "The Rains of Castamere" with the Lannisters' soldiers. When one of the soldiers asks, "Where'd you learn the Lannister song?", Bronn replies, "Drunk Lannisters." An instrumental version can be heard during Tyrion's speech right after King Joffrey abandons the battlefield in the same episode. The season 2 soundtrack contains a rendition of the song "The Rains of Castamere" by the indie rock band The National, sung by their vocalist Matt Berninger. The song is also played over the end credits of the season 2 episode 9, "Blackwater". 

In season 3, an instrumental version of "The Rains of Castamere" plays over the end credits in episode 7, "The Bear and the Maiden Fair". In episode 9 of season 3, also titled "The Rains of Castamere", an instrumental version of the song is played by the musicians at the Red Wedding. 

In episode 2 of season 4 ("The Lion and the Rose"), the Icelandic band Sigur Rós makes a cameo appearance as musicians performing their rendition of "The Rains of Castamere" at Joffrey and Margaery's wedding. Joffrey stops them midway by throwing coins at them. Their version also plays over the closing credits of this episode.

An orchestral rendition of the tune appears as House Lannister's theme throughout seasons 3 and 4, available in the soundtrack as "A Lannister Always Pays His Debts".

A new version of the song was released on the Season 8 soundtrack featuring Serj Tankian of the American heavy metal band System of a Down on lead vocals.

Credits and personnel
Personnel adapted from the album liner notes.

 The National – band, primary artist
 Ramin Djawadi – composer, primary artist, producer
 David Benioff – liner notes

 D.B. Weiss – liner notes 
 George R.R. Martin – lyricist

Chart positions

See also
Game of Thrones Theme
Music of Game of Thrones

References

Music of Game of Thrones
2012 songs
2012 compositions
Songs from television series